Khorand may refer to:
Khorand, Hamadan
Khorand, Kerman